Ško-Energo Aréna is an indoor sporting arena located in Mladá Boleslav, Czech Republic.

It is the home of BK Mladá Boleslav ice hockey club of the Czech Extraliga.

External links
Information from club website
Arena information

Indoor ice hockey venues in the Czech Republic
Indoor arenas in the Czech Republic
1956 establishments in Czechoslovakia
Buildings and structures in Mladá Boleslav
Sports venues completed in 1956
20th-century architecture in the Czech Republic